Nathaniel Charles Jacob Rothschild, 4th Baron Rothschild,  (born 29 April 1936), is a British peer, investment banker and a member of the Rothschild banking family. 

Now mostly retired, he has held many important roles in business, finance and British public life, and has been active in several charitable and philanthropic areas.

Early life
Born in  Berkshire, England, he is the eldest son of Victor Rothschild, 3rd Baron Rothschild, by his first wife Barbara Judith Rothschild  (née Hutchinson). His father was born into a Jewish family, while his mother converted to Orthodox Judaism when they married. Rothschild was educated at Eton College and then at Christ Church, Oxford, where he gained a First in history, tutored by Hugh Trevor-Roper. Emma Georgina Rothschild and Amschel Rothschild are his half-siblings.

Business career
From 1963 Rothschild worked at the family bank N M Rothschild & Sons in London, before resigning in 1980 due to a family dispute. The chairmanship of the bank had passed from his father, who had chosen to follow a scientific career and had lost control of the majority voting shares, to his distant cousin Sir Evelyn Robert de Rothschild. He sold his minority stake in the bank, but took independent control of Rothschild Investment Trust (now RIT Capital Partners plc), an investment trust listed on the London Stock Exchange.

After resigning from the bank in 1980, Jacob Rothschild went on to found J. Rothschild Assurance Group (now St. James's Place plc) with Sir Mark Weinberg in 1991. In 1989, he joined forces with Sir James Goldsmith and Kerry Packer in an unsuccessful bid for British American Tobacco.

Rothschild is Chairman of RIT Capital Partners plc, one of the largest investment trusts quoted on the London Stock Exchange with a net asset value of about £2 billion. He is Chairman of J Rothschild Capital Management, a subsidiary of RIT Capital Partners plc. He also retains many other venture capital and property interests.

From November 2003 until his retirement in 2008, he was Deputy Chairman of BSkyB Television and until 2008 he was a Director of RHJ International. He has also been a Member of the council for the Duchy of Cornwall for the Prince of Wales and a member of the International Advisory Board of The Blackstone Group.

He was appointed Commander of the Royal Victorian Order (CVO) in the 2020 New Year Honours for services to the Duchy of Cornwall.

Oil interests
In 2003, it was reported that Russian oil industrialist Mikhail Khodorkovsky's shares in YUKOS passed to him under a deal which they had concluded prior to Khodorkovsky's arrest.

In November 2010, an entity affiliated with Rothschild purchased a 5% equity interest in Genie Energy, a subsidiary of IDT Corporation, for $10 million. In 2013, Israel granted Genie Energy exclusive oil and gas exploration rights to a 153-square mile area in the southern part of the Israeli-occupied Golan Heights.

Personal life

In 1961, Rothschild married Serena Mary Dunn, a granddaughter of the Canadian financier Sir James Dunn, and they had four children. Lady Rothschild died in 2019. Their four children are: 
 Hannah Mary Rothschild Brookfield (22 May 1962). She married William Brookfield in 1994 and they were divorced. They have three daughters.
 Beth Matilda Rothschild Tomassini (27 February 1964). She married Antonio Tomassini in 1991 and they were divorced. They have three children.
 Emily "Emmy" Magda Rothschild Freeman-Attwood (19 December 1967). She married Julian Freeman-Attwood on 25 June 1998. They have two daughters.
 Nathaniel Philip Victor James Rothschild (12 July 1971). He married Annabelle Neilson on 13 November 1995, and they were divorced in 1997. He married Loretta Basey in 2016.

Lord Rothschild leases Spencer House, London.

Philanthropy
Jacob Rothschild has played a prominent part in Arts philanthropy in Britain. He was Chairman of Trustees of the National Gallery from 1985 to 1991, and from 1992 to 1998, chairman of the National Heritage Memorial Fund. From 1994 to 1998, and at the invitation of the Prime Minister, he was chairman of the Heritage Lottery Fund, responsible for distributing the proceeds of the National Lottery to the heritage sector, an influential post which oversaw the distribution of £1.2 billion in grants.

In the past, he has also been a Trustee of the State Hermitage Museum of St Petersburg (retired 2008); a Trustee of the Qatar Museums Authority (retired 2010); Chairman of the Pritzker Prize for Architecture (2002–2004); Chairman of both the Gilbert Collection Trust and the Hermitage Development Trust, Somerset House; a Trustee and Honorary Fellow of the Courtauld Institute, Somerset House; and a Fellow, Benefactor, and member of the Visitors' Committees of the Ashmolean Museum Oxford (retired 2008). In 2014, he received the J. Paul Getty Medal "for extraordinary achievement in the fields of museology, art historical research, philanthropy, conservation and conservation science".

He was especially active in the project to restore Somerset House in London, for which he helped secure the Gilbert Collection and ensured the long-term future of the Courtauld Institute of Art. As a private project, he carried out the restoration of Spencer House, one of the finest surviving 18th century London townhouses, adjacent to his own offices.

In 1993 he joined with John Sainsbury, Baron Sainsbury of Preston Candover to set up the Butrint Foundation to record and conserve the archaeological site of Butrint in Albania, close to his holiday home on Corfu. Today, Jacob remains Chairman of the Butrint Foundation.

Jacob Rothschild has also followed the Rothschild family's charitable interests in Israel and was the chairman of Yad Hanadiv, the family foundation which gave the Knesset and the Supreme Court buildings to Israel between 1989 and 2018. He is also president of The Rothschild Foundation (Hanadiv) Europe,  and Patron and Chairman of the Board of Trustees of The Rothschild Foundation. In addition, he is Honorary President of the Institute for Jewish Policy Research.

He has served as a Member of the Arts & Humanities Research Board, set up by the British government, is an honorary fellow of the British Academy, and a Trustee of The Prince of Wales's Charitable Fund.  He is also honorary president of the Institute for Jewish Policy Research.

In the past, he has been a Member of the UK Main Honours Board (retired 2008); Chairman of the Honours Committee for Arts and Media (retired 2008); Trustee of the Edmond J Safra Foundation (retired 2010); and a Member of committee of the Henry J Kravis Prize for Creative Philanthropy (retired 2010).

Waddesdon Manor
In 1988 he inherited from his aunt Dorothy de Rothschild, the Waddesdon and Eythrope estates in Buckinghamshire, and began a close association with Waddesdon Manor, the house and grounds which were built by Baron Ferdinand de Rothschild in the 1880s and bequeathed to the National Trust in 1957 by his cousin, James A. de Rothschild. He has been a major benefactor of the restoration of Waddesdon Manor through a private family charitable trust and, in an unusual arrangement, has been given authority by the National Trust to run Waddesdon Manor as a semi-independent operation. The cellars at Waddesdon Manor house his personal collection of 15,000 bottles of Rothschild wines dating as far back as 1870.

Open to the public, Waddesdon attracted over 466,000 visitors in 2018, with 157,000 visiting the house in 2015.  Waddesdon has won many awards over the last 20 years, including Visit England's "Large Visitor Attraction of the Year" category in 2017, Museum of the Year Award and Best National Trust Property.

He commissioned the 2015 RIBA Award winner Flint House on the Waddesdon Manor estate in Buckinghamshire, UK. Rothschild donated the property to the Rothschild Foundation which manages the rest of the estate for the National Trust.

The estate has been a venue for visiting heads of state including Presidents Ronald Reagan and Bill Clinton. Margaret Thatcher received French President François Mitterrand there at a summit in 1990. It hosted the European Economic Round Table conference in 2002, organised by Warren Buffett and attended by James Wolfensohn, former president of the World Bank, and Arnold Schwarzenegger.

Honours and awards

In United Kingdom
Member of the Order of Merit (OM) – 2002.
Knight Grand Cross of the Order of the British Empire (GBE) – 1998 New Year Honours, "for services to the Arts and to Heritage."
Commander of the Royal Victorian Order (CVO) – 2020 New Year Honours, "for services to The Prince's Council, Duchy of Cornwall"
The Prince of Wales Medal for Arts Philanthropy 2013
Awarded honorary degrees from the universities of Oxford, London, Exeter, Keele, Newcastle and Warwick
Honorary Fellow of the British Academy (Hon FBA) – 1998
Senior Fellow of the Royal College of Art (FRCA) – 1992
Honorary Fellow of King's College London (Hon FKC) – 2002
"Apollo Personality of the Year" – 2002
Honorary President of the Institute for Jewish Policy – 2002
Mont Blanc Award – 2004
Tercentenary Medal for St Petersburg – 2005
Honorary Student of Christ Church, Oxford – March 2006

In the United States
The Hadrian Award from the World Monuments Fund - 1995
The Classical America – Arthur Ross Award 1998
The Iris Foundation Award – the BARD Institute 1999
The Golden Plate Award of the American Academy of Achievement 2000
The Centennial Medal of the American Academy in Rome - 2002
The Kennedy Center's International Committee Lifetime Achievement Gold Medal in the Arts Award 2006
Royal Oak Foundation "Timeless Design Award" - 2009
The J. Paul Getty Medal - 2014

In Continental Europe
Commander of the Order of Henry the Navigator (1985) – Portugal
Europa Nostra Medal of Honour in Brussels – 2003
Freedom of the City of Saranda – Albania 2003
Honoree of the Gennadius Library Trustees' Annual Award 2010
National Flag Order – Albania 2014

In Israel
The Sir Winston Churchill Award (2004)
The Weizmann Award (50th Anniversary of the State of Israel)
Honorary degree from the Hebrew University of Jerusalem
Honorary fellowships from City of Jerusalem and the Israel Museum, the Commonwealth Jewish Council Award.

Arms

See also
Nathaniel Philip Rothschild – his youngest child and only son
Rothschild family

References

External links

1936 births
Alumni of Christ Church, Oxford
4
Bankers from London
British Ashkenazi Jews
English Jews
Philanthropists from London
Fellows of King's College London
Honorary Fellows of the British Academy
Knights Grand Cross of the Order of the British Empire
Living people
Members of the Order of Merit
People educated at Eton College
Place of birth missing (living people)
English people of German-Jewish descent
Waddesdon Manor
Commanders of the Royal Victorian Order
Rothschild